Antigua Winds is a manufacturer of woodwind and brass instruments like saxophones, clarinets, trumpets, flutes, and musical instrument accessories. It was founded in 1991 by musician and educator Fred Hoey in San Antonio, Texas. Antigua Winds specializes in professional and student instruments. 

In 2018, St. Louis Music secured exclusive North American distribution rights for Antigua Winds.

Saxophones 

Antigua Winds first began as a saxophone manufacturer. Antigua saxophones are student Antigua VOSI series, intermediate Antigua series, and professional Antigua Pro - Power Bell Series. Antigua cooperated with Peter Ponzol in 2011 for Pro-One Saxophones.

Clarinets 

The Antigua-Backun clarinet is the newest instrument by Antigua Winds and Backun Musical Services. It was part of the list of The Top 50 Band Standouts on Music Inc. Magazine in March 2012.

References

External links
 
 Downbeat Magazine Review
 Music Inc. Magazine

Musical instrument manufacturing companies of the United States
Manufacturing companies based in San Antonio
American companies established in 1991
1991 establishments in Texas